Tereza Krejčiříková (born 21 June 1996) is a Czech football midfielder, currently playing for Slavia Praha in the Czech First Division. She is a member of the Czech national team.

Career
While playing for Sparta Prague's youth team, Krejčiříková was voted talent of the year at the 2011 Czech Footballer of the Year (women). The following season she was promoted to the Czech First Division, and on 27 November 2013 she made her debut for the national team in a FIFA World Cup qualification match against Spain. In 2016 she moved to Slavia Prague.

International goals

Career honours

Club

Sparta 
Czech First Division (1): 2012-13
 Czech Women's Cup (1): 2013, 2015

Individual
 Talent of the Year: 2011

References

1996 births
Living people
Czech women's footballers
People from Klatovy
Czech Republic women's international footballers
Women's association football midfielders
SK Slavia Praha (women) players
AC Sparta Praha (women) players
Czech Women's First League players
Sportspeople from the Plzeň Region